2011–12 Spor Toto Turkish Cup is the 26th edition of the TBF Men's Turkish Cup, and the debut of Beşiktaş Milangaz bringing home their first Turkish Cup Basketball win for the club.

TBF

Group stage
Group B and D matches played 6–8 October; group A and C matches played 9–11 October 2011.

Group A
Group A matches played in Eskişehir.

Group B
Group B matches played in Erzurum.

Group C
Group C matches played in İzmir.

Group D
Group D matches played in Samsun.

Final 8
The tournament finals were played among the top eight teams out of four groups, on 14–18 February 2012. Quarter-finals were played on 14-15 February 2012. Semi-finals are on 16 February 2012. Final match will be played on 18 February 2012.

Finals bracket

External links
 Official Turkish Cup Website

Turkish Cup Basketball seasons
Cup